The Jiak Kim Bridge is a pedestrian bridge in Singapore. The bridge spans the Singapore River near Robertson Quay. Constructed in 1999, it was named after Tan Jiak Kim, grandson of famous merchant and philanthropist Tan Kim Seng and son of Tan Beng Swee. He is also a prominent Straits-born Chinese merchant and political activist during the early 19th century.

References

Bridges in Singapore